Khairat Abdulrazaq-Gwadabe (born 1957) is a Nigerian politician. She was elected Senator for the Abuja Federal Capital Territory constituency, Nigeria at the start of the Nigerian Fourth Republic, running on the People's Democratic Party (PDP) platform. She held office from May 1999 to May 2003.

Abdulrazaq-Gwadabe is a sister to Governor AbdulRahman AbdulRazaq and wife to Colonel Lawan Gwadabe, a former military governor of Niger State. She was born in Ilorin in April 1957. She studied law at the University of Buckingham. After taking her seat in the Senate she was appointed to committees on the Environment, Health, Women Affairs (chairman), Federal Character, Tourism & Culture and Federal Capital Territory.
She was a member of the Panel of Review of Nigeria Customs and Excise.

Abdulrazaq-Gwadabe was a contender to be PDP candidate for her senate seat in 2003, but lost in the primaries. This may have been due to her previous support for a move to impeach President Olusegun Obasanjo.
In January 2003 she announced that she was moving to the All Nigeria People's Party (ANPP) due to unfair treatment by the PDP.

In August 2005, six years after marriage, Abdulrazaq-Gwadabe gave birth to her first child, a boy, at a hospital in Miami, Florida, US. She was aged 48. The father of the new baby, Colonel Lawan Gwadabe, was former military governor of Niger State. 
As of December 2011, Senator Abdulrazaq-Gwadabe was the chairman of the Senators Forum, through which former and serving senators share their knowledge and experience.

References

Living people
Peoples Democratic Party members of the Senate (Nigeria)
All Nigeria Peoples Party politicians
University of Lagos alumni
People from Ilorin
20th-century Nigerian politicians
20th-century Nigerian women politicians
21st-century Nigerian politicians
21st-century Nigerian women politicians
1962 births